De Brief voor Sinterklaas (Dutch for: The Letter for Sinterklaas) is a 2019 Dutch film directed by Lucio Messercola.

Plot 

Sinterklaas is in need of more Black Petes (Zwarte Pieten) to assist him with the annual feast of Sinterklaas. He decides to hold auditions to recruit more Black Petes during a "Black Pete day" ("Pietendag"). Sem sends a letter to Sinterklaas hoping to become a Black Pete but Mammie and Huibert Jan are plotting to sabotage the day.

Cast 

 Bram van der Vlugt as Sinterklaas
 Pamela Teves as Mammie
 Edo Brunner as Huibert Jan
 Lieke van Lexmond as Anna
 Bo Burger as Sem
 Jelle de Jong as David
 Erik de Vogel as himself
 Chris Tates as Hugo Hogepief
 Wesley Mutsaars as Paco Post
 Martijn van Nellestijn as Postbode
 Roel Dirven as Carlo Cadeaux
 Maaike Bakker as Patty Pepernoot
 Aad van Toor as Adriaan
 Joshua Albano as Benny Taai Taai
 Aaron Groeneveld as Vrachtpiet
 Jimmy van Schaik as Dex

Production 

Filming concluded on 7 March 2019. One of the filming locations for the film was the Dutch town of Purmerend.

References

External links 
 

2019 films
2010s Dutch-language films
Dutch children's films
Sinterklaas films
Films shot in the Netherlands
Films set in the Netherlands
Films directed by Lucio Messercola
Purmerend